33rd Division or 33rd Infantry Division may refer to:

Infantry divisions
 33rd Infantry Division (Bangladesh), a division of Bangladesh
 33rd Infantry Division (France)
 33rd Division (German Empire)
 33rd Reserve Division (German Empire)
 33rd Infantry Division (Wehrmacht), Germany
 33rd Waffen Grenadier Division of the SS Charlemagne (1st French), Germany
 33rd Infantry Division Acqui, Kingdom of Italy
 33rd Division (Imperial Japanese Army)
 33rd Infantry Division (Poland)
 33rd Motor Rifle Division, Soviet Union
 33rd Division (Spain)
 33rd Division (United Kingdom)
 33rd Infantry Division (United States)
 33rd Al-Mahdi Division, Iran

Other divisions
 33rd Waffen Cavalry Division of the SS (3rd Hungarian), Germany
 33rd Armoured Division, India
 33rd Air Division, United States

See also 
 33rd Brigade (disambiguation)
 XXXIII Corps (disambiguation)
 33rd Regiment (disambiguation)
 33rd Squadron (disambiguation)